Fitzwilliam is a small village on the edge of West Yorkshire, England, in the City of Wakefield district. The village falls within the Hemsworth ward of Wakefield City Council.

Governance
It is part of the town of Hemsworth and local government is in the hands of Wakefield Metropolitan District Council, with the Hemsworth Town Council as a mainly consultative body. However, the Post Office recognises it as a separate settlement from the town of Hemsworth.

History

It was built as a pit village. It has a railway station on the Wakefield Line, providing it with connections to Leeds, Wakefield, Doncaster and Sheffield.  The railway station closed in 1967, reopened in 1982 and the line was electrified in 1989.

The village provided housing for miners at the colliery originally named "Fitzwilliam Main".  The name was taken from the family name of the colliery's proprietor. In 1905, a bitter industrial dispute led to all the miners being expelled from their homes, which were owned by the Fitzwilliam family; this became known as the "Kinsley eviction".

The mine later changed its name to Hemsworth Colliery which closed in 1969. Kinsley Drift Mine was opened on the site of the old Hemsworth Colliery in 1977. In the long-running Miners' Strike of 1984 to 1985, a riot took place in Fitzwilliam on 9 July 1984, and nine people ("The Fitzwilliam Nine") were convicted of public order offences as a result.

Kinsley and nearby Nostell Pit were closed in 1986 and 1987 respectively. South Kirkby Colliery closed in 1988. As a result, there was a high level of unemployment in the locality and migration led to it being labelled as a ghost town. Between 2003 and 2006, part of the village was demolished, including the whole of the "City estate", to clear derelict properties. In response, Fitzwilliam was included in the Hemsworth Coalfield regeneration area and has received special funding to aid its recovery.  The economy improved much in the first decade of the 21st century and unemployment in the Hemsworth seat fell to 3% in 2007, although there are no statistics specifically for Fitzwilliam.

Notable residents
 Geoffrey Boycott, cricketer
 Cyril and Peter Knowles, footballers
 Sir Albert Lamb commonly known as Larry Lamb, newspaper editor

The band Chumbawamba recorded a song named after the village, which described its painful decline following the 1984-85 miners' strike. The village also plays a large role in the crime novel Nineteen Seventy Four, in which it is introduced in a list of "hard towns for hard men" and then later referred to as "a dirty brown mining town" and "where the night comes early and nowt [nothing] feels right, where the kids kill cats and the men kill kids".

See also
Listed buildings in Hemsworth

References

External links

The Fitzwilliam Archive Online

Villages in West Yorkshire
Hemsworth